Castel Gabbiano is a comune in the north of the Province of Cremona, in Lombardy, northern Italy.

References 

Municipalities of the Province of Cremona